Dakrya is a theatrical metal band from Athens, Greece, created in late 2004, when classically trained keyboard player SophiaX (a.k.a. Sophia Charalampous) decided to combine a slew of disparate musical influences (heavy metal, goth, progressive, symphonic, and art rock) with a theatrical presentation.

History
Many rehearsals and line-up changes brought the first demo release for Dakrya in mid-2005 entitled Without Destination. The singers Margina (female vocals) and Costas Lazarou (male vocals) participated as guest musicians for the recordings of the song. The reviews were good and soon Christina Kalantzi (vocals) and Thina Chat (vocals) joined the band as lead singers. Many live shows followed (mostly in Greece) as the band worked on new songs for their first full-length album to come.

In 2007 Dakrya enters the studios to record their debut album entitled Monumento that was released on May 23, 2008 by Another Sphere Records (in France, Canada, Belgium) and 279 Productions (Greece & Cyprus). Monumento received much praise for its highly unusual yet carefully conceived musical concept. In early 2009 Dakrya was the opening act for the live show of Moonspell at Principal Club Theater in Thessaloniki. After this show, George Droulias (Guitars & Vocals) had to leave the band for personal reasons. Meanwhile, Dakrya worked with a few session guitarists until late 2009 when Angelos Charogiannis (Guitars) joined the band and George Droulias (Guitars & Vocals) returned.

In 2010 the band came up with a new concept album and entered the studios once again for the recordings. In March 2010 the band traveled to Sweden to produce their new album with Pelle Saether (Diablo Swing Orchestra, Madder Mortem, A.C.T) and Goran Finnberg (Dark Tranquillity, Opeth, Arch Enemy). On May 23, 2010 Dakrya released a CD-Single with the song "The Urban Tribe". In July 2010 the band signed a worldwide contract with "Intromental Management & Booking Agency" and also with Sensory Records for the release of their second full-length album entitled "Crime Scene. The album was released on October 12, 2010 worldwide and received great reviews from the press.

In 2012-2013 the band's line-up changes when Angelos Charogiannis (Guitars) and Christina Kalantzi (Vocals) are replaced by John Kefallinos (Guitars) and Mike Karasoulis (Vocals).

Members

Current members
Thina Chat - Vocals
Mike Karasoulis - Vocals
George Droulias - Guitars, Backing Vocals
Giannis Kefallinos - Guitars
SophiaX - Keyboards
Alex Drakos - Bass
Stavros Vorissis - Drums

Past members
Christina Kalantzi - Vocals  (2005 - 2012)
Angelos Charogiannis - Guitars  (2009 - 2011)
Charis Kampitsis - Drums (2005 - 2007)

Discography

Albums
Monumento (May 23, 2008)
Crime Scene (October 12, 2010)

Singles
The Urban Tribe (2010, CD-Single)

Compilations
Demonic and Divine (June 1, 2009, Femme Metal Records)

References

External links
Dakrya Official WebSite

Avant-garde metal musical groups
Musical groups established in 2004
Greek gothic metal musical groups
Greek heavy metal musical groups
Musical groups from Athens